"Bright Stream" is the 28th single by Japanese singer and voice actress Nana Mizuki, released on August 1, 2012 by King Records.

Track listing 
 "Bright Stream"
Lyrics: Nana Mizuki
Composition: Eriko Yoshiki
Arrangement: Hitoshi Fujima (Elements Garden)
Theme song for anime movie Magical Girl Lyrical Nanoha The Movie 2nd A's
 "Fearless Hero"
Lyrics: Shoko Fujibayashi
Composition: Yuki Nara
Arrangement: Junpei Fujita (Elements Garden)
Opening theme for anime television Dog Days'
 "Sacred Force"
Lyrics: Hibiki
Composition: Shihori
Arrangement: Hitoshi Fujima (Elements Garden)
Insert song for anime movie Magical Girl Lyrical Nanoha The Movie 2nd A's

Charts
Oricon Sales Chart (Japan)

References

2012 singles
Nana Mizuki songs
Songs written by Nana Mizuki
2012 songs
King Records (Japan) singles
Japanese film songs
Songs written for animated films